Lansfordite is a hydrated magnesium  carbonate mineral with composition: MgCO3·5H2O. Landsfordite was discovered in 1888 in a coal mine in Lansford, Pennsylvania. It crystallizes in the monoclinic system (space group P21/c) and typically occurs as colorless to white prismatic crystals and stalactitic masses. It is a soft mineral, Mohs hardness of 2.5, with a low specific gravity of 1.7. It is transparent to translucent with refractive indices of 1.46 to 1.51. The mineral will effloresce at room temperature, producing nesquehonite.

References

Magnesium minerals
Carbonate minerals
Geology of Pennsylvania
Monoclinic minerals
Minerals in space group 14